Sergey Sergeyevich Shustikov (born 5 March 1989) is a Russian footballer.

Club career
He made his Russian Premier League debut for FC Krylia Sovetov Samara on 20 September 2008 in a game against FC Amkar Perm.

Personal life
He is a member of FC Torpedo Moscow dynasty, both his grandfather Viktor and his father Sergey Sr. played for Torpedo for many years.

References

External links
 
 Profile by Football National League

1989 births
Footballers from Moscow
Living people
Russian footballers
Association football defenders
Russia under-21 international footballers
PFC Krylia Sovetov Samara players
FC Torpedo Moscow players
FC Rostov players
FC Khimik Dzerzhinsk players
FC Lokomotiv Moscow players
FC Akzhayik players
Russian Premier League players
Russian First League players
Russian Second League players
Kazakhstan Premier League players
Russian expatriate footballers
Expatriate footballers in Kazakhstan
FC Volga Ulyanovsk players